The Bavarian Class Gt 2×4/4 (bayerische Gt 2x4/4) engine of the Royal Bavarian State Railways (Königlich Bayerische Staats-Eisenbahnen or K.Bay.Sts.B.), was a heavy goods train tank locomotive of the Mallet type. It was later designated the DRG Class 96 (Baureihe 96) by the DRG, DB and DR.

Description

The Gt 2x4/4 Mallet locomotive was equipped with two sets of compound-configured running gear, the front one, pivoted on a 15 cm thick coupling pin, had large low-pressure cylinders, and the rear one, which was fixed, had smaller high-pressure cylinders. Both had one driven and three coupled axles. The designer of this heavy locomotive was the then senior engineer and director at Maffei, Anton Hammel, (1857-1925), who had also developed the famous S 3/6. Between 1913 and 1914 the first series of 15 vehicles was procured and they entered service in 1914. The locomotives caused quite a stir at that time and could be seen at the railway exhibitions frequently held in those days (e.g. the 1922 transport exhibition in Munich) - and, like the S 3/6, they were often painted with a blue or ochre yellow photographic livery and adorned with a crowned chimney. As the first one of the second series, no. 5766 (96 016) was even spruced up with brass bands on the crowned chimney and boiler as well as brass decorations on its front cylinders, and certainly made an impression. A similar thing was carried out on the same locomotive after the rebuilding of the second series in 1926. Otherwise, the first series had a narrow chimney with a cap similar to the Prussian P 8. The operational livery of the K.Bay.Sts.B. locomotives was green with yellow lettering and a black chassis. 

Due to the advent of the Prussian T 20 (DRG Class 95) in 1922 with its 1'E1' axle arrangement and better qualities than the initial Gt 2x4/4 series, a second series was built and deployed between 1922 (no. 5766) and 1923 (nos. 5767–5775). They were improved in comparison with their predecessors: greater evaporative heating area, capable of holding half a ton of coal more, greater axle load and service weight, short chimney (without a cap). Both series were later modified in different ways after being taken over by the Deutsche Reichsbahn, and incorporated into its classification scheme as Class 960. All locomotives were equipped with a Westinghouse compressed-air double brake, operating on all wheelsets from the front, the sand pipes initially served the second and fourth wheelsets of the front drive. After the modification of the second series in 1926, they were additionally fitted with a Riggenbach counter-pressure brake, and seven axles sanded to increase adhesion. To begin with the locos ran with three headlights at the front, but just two after 1926.

Rebuild

In 1925/1926 all the engines were rebuilt and strengthened, those of the first series being modified to a lesser extent (e.g. chimney enlargement, coal capacity increased from 4 to 4.5 t, boiler data, ride) than those of the second series. The following table shows the main changes that were made to second series:

 High-pressure cylinder extended from 520 mm to 600 mm diameter
 Blastpipe set lower and diameter increased
 Chimney widened and shortened a little
 Reduction in the number of heating tubes and increase in the number of smoke tubes
 Reduction in the total tube heating area
 Increase in the superheater area
 Installation of a feedwater heater (Oberflächenvorwärmer) in front of the stack
 Installation of a second air pump next to the first
 Installation of Riggenbach counter-pressure brake
 Increased coal bunker capacity from 4.5 t to 5 t
 Modified boiler fittings (sandbox, steam dome)
 Modifications to improve the ride ('slipping' of the front LP running gear)
 Sand pipes for 7 instead of 2 wheelsets
 Increase in adhesive weight from 123.2 to 131.1 Mp 
 Increase in the centre coupled axle's axle load from 15.4 Mp to 16.4 Mp

Area of operations

The locomotives were developed specially for the steep ramps in the K.Bay.Sts.B.'s territory: the railway line from Sonneberg–Probstzella, the Spessart ramp, the Franconian Forest Railway (Frankenwaldbahn), the Schiefe Ebene (lit: inclined plane), and the line from Eger to Asch (today Cheb-Aš). Its Mallet design at this size proved to have good traction and curve running on the tight mountain bends. The first test journey in 1914 took place on the route from Lichtenfels-Rothenkirchen. It was worth being able to mount the steep ramps in a much shorter time in order for the lines to generate a profit. In this role she was able to provide good service for up to 30 years and more, especially as a pusher locomotive, but also as the motive power for goods and passenger trains and reduced journey times by around 40%. The Mallet could manage an incline of 25‰ at 25 km/h hauling 465 tons, and could achieve a maximum of 40 km/h with lighter trains.

During World War I, when Germany occupied Belgium, four Gt 2x4/4 were briefly used as banking engines on the steep incline between Liège and Ans (29,9‰). However, they performed quite poorly and were soon withdrawn from this task.

Along with other high performance steam engines like the "H02 1001" and a coal dust-fired Prussian G 12 (DRG BR 58), loco no. 96 019 was to be seen at the world trade conference in Berlin-Tempelhof in 1930, where she was Germany's and Europe's heaviest Mallet tank locomotive. Quite a few locos were stabled in the locomotive depots (Bahnbetriebswerke or Bw) at Aschaffenburg, Neuenmarkt-Wirsberg and Rothenkirchen. Others were stationed at Munich and Eger.

Retirement

Six machines (96 001, 96 003, 96 005, 96 007, 96 013, 96 014) were retired by 1945 and 96 015 was lost to military action. After 1945, nine engines of each series remained in the territory of the Deutsche Bundesbahn. They were stationed in Munich and Nuremberg and were retired in 1948 as a splinter class with fewer than 20 units.
Of those, two machines, 96 002 and 96 024, went to the Deutsche Reichsbahn (East Germany) and until 1954 were on the books of the Stendal repair shop.

Models 
No examples have survived - only two excellent 1:10 scale models (1.82 m long) of prototypes in the second series, 96 016 and 96 025, can be admired in the  Deutsches Museum at Munich and in the Nuremberg Transport Museum. They were made during the 1930s by students at the repair shed in Ingolstadt.

For many years Märklin offered an H0 model in different colour schemes and also a model in Z scale. An N gauge model has been available from Arnold.

A static model (unknown brand) was also offered as part of a collection series, presumably in HO scale.

See also 
 Royal Bavarian State Railways 
 List of Bavarian locomotives and railbuses

References

External links 

 The Gt 2x4/4 malletlok.de
  Gt 2 x 4-4 - K.Bay.St.B. - BR 96 - DRG Märklinfan Club Italia
  ModelsList of bay. Gt 2 x 4-4 Bauart 1913/1923 Frits-Osterhun-Files
  LCTM  Lista de Correo de Trenes Märklin

Mallet locomotives
Gt 2×4 4
Standard gauge locomotives of Germany
Maffei locomotives
Railway locomotives introduced in 1913
D′D h4vt locomotives
0-8-8-0 locomotives 
Freight locomotives